Trachymyrmex  is a genus of fungus-growing ants in the subfamily Myrmicinae. The genus is mainly tropical in distribution, with most species being found in Central and South America.

The queens of the species appear to mate with only one male on their nuptial flight.

Species
A number of species were moved from Trachymyrmex based on molecular phylogeny by Solomon et al. 2019. Of the species formerly included, nine were retained in Trachymyrmex, while 31 of the species were moved to the new genus Mycetomoellerius, and an additional nine moved to Paratrachymyrmex.

Trachymyrmex species

T. arizonensis 
T. carinatus 
T. desertorum 
T. nogalensis 
T. pakawa 
T. pomonae 
T. saussurei 
T. septentrionalis 
T. smithi 

Species moved to Mycetomoellerius

T. agudensis 
T. atlanticus 
T. cirratus 
T. compactus 
T. dichrous 
T. echinus 
T. farinosus 
T. fiebrigi 
T. gaigei 
T. guianensis 
T. haytianus 
T. holmgreni 
T. iheringi 
T. isthmicus 
T. ixyodus 
T. jamaicensis 
T. kempfi 
T. oetkeri 
T. opulentus  (jr syn *T. wheeleri)
T. papulatus 
†T. primaevus 
T. pruinosus 
T. relictus 
T. ruthae 
T. squamulifer 
T. tucumanus 
T. turrifex 
T. urichii 
T. verrucosus 
T. zeteki 

Species moved to Paratrachymyrmex

T. bugnioni 
T. carib 
T. cornetzi 
T. diversus 
T. intermedius  (Type)
T. irmgardae 
T. levis 
T. mandibularis 
T. phaleratus

References

External links

Myrmicinae
Ant genera
Hymenoptera of North America
Hymenoptera of South America
Taxa named by Auguste Forel